Cow Creek is a medium-sized river in southwestern Oregon, a tributary of the South Umpqua River. Although the vast majority of the basin is within Douglas County, a tiny portion in the southeast extends into northern Jackson County.

Course
The stream rises in the Umpqua National Forest at the confluence of South Fork Cow Creek and East Fork Cow Creek. The south fork, which is much larger, is sometimes considered the main stem. In its first few miles the creek flows west through an agricultural valley and through Galesville Reservoir. Cow Creek runs alongside Interstate 5 for several miles and receives Windy Creek from the right at Glendale, Oregon. The stream then bends northwest into a canyon, receiving West Fork Cow Creek on the left and Middle Creek from the right. It then continues northwards, bending steadily eastwards and doubling back on its former course.

See also
 List of longest streams of Oregon
 Cow Creek Band of Umpqua Tribe of Indians

References

Rivers of Oregon
Rivers of Jackson County, Oregon
Rivers of Douglas County, Oregon